John Russell (29 December 1872 – 10 August 1905), also known as Jock Russell, was a Scottish professional footballer who played as an outside left in the Scottish League for Leith Athletic, St Mirren, Port Glasgow Athletic and Motherwell, in the English Football League for Woolwich Arsenal, Blackburn Rovers and Doncaster Rovers, and in the English Southern League for Bristol City and Brighton & Hove Albion.

References

1872 births
1905 deaths
Footballers from South Lanarkshire
Scottish footballers
Association football outside forwards
Wishaw Juniors F.C. players
Leith Athletic F.C. players
St Mirren F.C. players
Arsenal F.C. players
Bristol City F.C. players
Blackburn Rovers F.C. players
Brighton & Hove Albion F.C. players
Port Glasgow Athletic F.C. players
Motherwell F.C. players
Doncaster Rovers F.C. players
Scottish Junior Football Association players
Scottish Football League players
English Football League players
Southern Football League players